The Fortress Invitational, formerly known as the Ice Vegas Invitational, is an annual mid-season college ice hockey tournament that has been held since 2018 at T-Mobile Arena on the Las Vegas Strip.

History
The Ice Vegas Invitational was created by BD Global, a marketing firm that had produced various college sports events in the Las Vegas area, in partnership with MGM Resorts International, the operator of T-Mobile Arena. The organizers hoped that the tournament would attract the top college hockey teams in the country by its third year, fueled by growing appreciation of ice hockey in the area since the launch of the Vegas Golden Knights of the National Hockey League. They expected the Invitational to demonstrate the arena's viability as an eventual venue for the NCAA Men's Ice Hockey Championship (the "Frozen Four").

In 2017, Arizona State decided to cancel the Desert Hockey Classic in order to participate in the inaugural Ice Vegas Invitational. They won the tournament.

The 2020 tournament was renamed the Fortress Invitational (in reference to T-Mobile Arena's nickname, "The Fortress"), and was hosted by the Golden Knights. It was held January 3 and 4, 2020 and included Army, Cornell, Ohio State and Providence. Providence defeated Army 3-1 in the first round while Cornell defeated Ohio State 5-2.

Yearly Results

References

External links
 

College ice hockey tournaments in the United States
Annual sporting events in the United States
Recurring sporting events established in 2018
2018 establishments in Nevada
Ice hockey competitions in Las Vegas